The European Company Lawyers Association (ECLA) is a non-governmental and non-profit organization and serves as the umbrella organization for 22 company lawyers associations in Europe, representing over 68,000 inhouse counsel from leading corporations across Europe. Established in 1983, ECLA advocates for the profession of in-house lawyers and addresses major challenges for legal in-house departments in European companies. The association is located in the heart of Europe, in Brussels.

History of ECLA
In 1980, an organization of company lawyers in Belgium took the initiative to contact other similar organizations in the Netherlands, England and Wales, Germany, Italy and France. These organizations began exchanging experiences and best practices on legal matters with particular reference to international business and European laws affecting the activities of their respective companies.

At the same time, company lawyers realized that the legal status of their profession was not in all European countries identical. In the UK and Germany company lawyers could be admitted to the national Bar, or to other professional associations (such as the Law Society), while in Belgium, France and Italy that was not permitted. So there were various regimes for company lawyers in the various Member States.

In 1983, ECLA was formed in Belgium as a private non-profit international association following the decision in the A.M.&S. case by the Court of Justice in Luxembourg, which denied the legal professional privilege (LPP) to the company lawyers in an antitrust case.

By 1990, ECLA's membership had grown significantly and included the organizations of company lawyers in Belgium, Denmark, Germany, Finland, France, Italy, the Netherlands, Scotland, England and Wales. After 1999 national organizations of company lawyers from Central and Easter European associations of company lawyers were admitted to ECLA membership.

On 11 April 2018, ECLA opened its new offices in Brussels, Belgium, and hosted the 2018 Reception. “We will bring Europe’s company lawyers closer together, offer a vital and unprecedented platform for networking and best practice sharing within the legal community”, said Jonathan Marsh, President of ECLA. With the new offices, permanent presence in Brussels and a strong team, the association is taking the next step to becoming the special “European Union” exclusively dedicated to the company lawyers of Europe.

Goals and activities of ECLA
ECLA aims to develop the legal professional privilege throughout European national jurisdictions, classifying the communication between a company and its in-house lawyers, and the advice sought and provided, as confidential.

In 1995 ECLA presented a position paper to the European institutions, especially the Commission's DGIV, to attract their attention on the company lawyers’ status in Europe. It contained a description of the company lawyer's role and function, insisting on the concept of independence, a description of ECLA and its members, and concluded with ECLA's proposals, reported below in summary:

 the company lawyer, being subject to a code of professional ethics and disciplinary rules, should be recognized as a branch of the legal profession, in its own right, by the authorities of the European Union and the Member States; (the ECLA Code of Ethics has been officially adopted by General Assembly in Tallinn on 30 May 2014 with some common principles for practice of company lawyers in Europe).
 that the use of the title "company lawyer" should be protected and reserved to the holders of university qualifications at a common level throughout Europe;
 that the function of company lawyer should be capable of being freely exercised under that title throughout Europe
 that the duties and rights of attorney-client privilege (or legal privilege) shall be clearly ascribed to company lawyers on the same basis as to other lawyers 
 that non-exclusive rights of audience for their company as existing in several Member States, be maintained and, where possible, extended to the same extent as for practicing lawyers;
 that holders of the title of company lawyer who have performed that function should be free to join in a national bar or law society or notaries order; and
 that company lawyers should, under conditions to be determined be eligible for appointment to judicial functions in tribunals and courts having jurisdiction on commercial matters.

ECLA promotes the acceptance and demand for an active role of company lawyers and identifies and exploits regulatory opportunities aimed to enhance the position of in-house lawyers. ECLA also seeks to identify and eliminate regulatory and judiciary threats for company lawyers. ECLA pursues these targets through six main activities:
 Monitoring
 Representation
 Cooperating
 Best Practice Sharing
 Networking
 Training

European member associations
Austria: Vereinigung Österreichischer Unternehmensjuristen (VUJ);
Belgium: Institut des juristes d’entreprise (IJE/IBJ);
Croatia: Udruga korporativnih pravnika (UKP);
Czech Republic - Unie Podnikových Právniků České republiky (UPPCR);
Denmark: Danske Virksomhedjurister (DVJ);
England and Wales - The Law Society (LSoEW);
Estonia: Eesti Juristide Liidu Ettevõtlusjuristide Uhendus (E.E.J.Ü.)
Finland: Teollisuuslakimiesten Yhdistys ry/Industrijuristföreningen r.f. (TYI);
France: Association Française des Juristes d’ Entreprise (AFJE);
France: Cercle Montesquieu (CM);
Germany: Arbeitsgemeinschaft der Syndikus Anwälte im Deutschen Anwaltverein (DAV) – German Bar Association;
Greece: Ελληνική Ένωση Εμμίσθων Δικηγόρων (GILA)
Ireland: The Law Society of Ireland (LSoI);
Italy: Associazione Italiana Giuristi di Impresa (AIGI);
Lithuania: Bendrovių & institucijų teisinikų asociacija (B.I.T.A.);
 Norway: Norges Juristforbund, NJ-P Private Sector (NLA);
Poland: Krajowa Izba Radców Prawnych (KIRP);
Portugal: Ordem dos Advogados – Instituto das Modalidades de Exercício da Advocacia (OdA);
Slovenia: Sekcija korporacijskih pravnikov (SKP);
Spain: Seccion de Abogados de Empresa - Ilustre Colegio de Abogados de Madrid (SAE);
Sweden: Sveriges Bolagsjurister (SBJ);
Switzerland: Vereinigung Schweizerischer Unternehmensjuristen (VSUJ);

For its members, ECLA offers regular updates on legal challenges and developments for in-house lawyers through its publications, digital and new media streams, conferences and events. It is their goal to enhance the flow of information and provide innovative platforms for best practice sharing and networking, as well as for cooperating with external law firms and service providers.

References

Law-related professional associations
International organisations based in Belgium